Jean-Pierre Mazery (born 5 December 1942 in Paris) is a French economist and was the Grand Chancellor (and Foreign Minister) of the Sovereign Military Order of Malta (SMOM) from 2005 - 2014.

Career
Mazery studied at the University of Paris and Harvard Business School before becoming an economist. 
He has been a Knight of Malta since 1975, as Knight of Magistral Grace. On 16 April 2005, he was elected Grand Chancellor of the Order, following the resignation of H.E. Bailiff Count Jacques de Liedekerke and was re-elected to this office in 2009. 

He first served under Prince and Grand Master Fra' Andrew Bertie and, since 2008, under Prince and Grand Master Fra' Matthew Festing at the Palazzo Malta in Rome. In recognition of his high office in the Order, he was promoted Bailiff Grand Cross of Honour and Devotion in Obedience.
On 30 May 2014, Mazery was not re-elected as Grand Chancellor, the holder of the office now Albrecht Freiherr von Boeselager.  The Grand Commander elect d'Ippolito was  Fra' Ludwig Hoffmann von Rumerstein, thus reconfirming the traditional attribution of these positions to members of the nobility.  This custom is not always respected.

Personal life
Mazery’s father was Pierre Mazery, an architect.

Mazery was married in 1973 to Christiane de Nicolay-Mazery, a writer.

They have two sons and a daughter.

Honours and awards
: Bailiff Grand Cross of Honour and Devotion in Obedience of the Sovereign Military Order of Malta
: Grand Cross of the Order pro merito Melitensi
: Officer of the Legion of Honour (31 December 2009)
: Officer of the Order of Arts and Letters
: Knight of the National Order of Merit
 : Grand Officer of the Order of Saint-Charles (14 October 2009)
: Knight Grand Cross of the Order of Merit of the Italian Republic
: Knight Grand Cross of the Order of Pius IX
 House of Romanov: Knight Grand Cross of the Order of St. Anna

See also 
 List of current foreign ministers

References

Citations

Sources 

 Grand Chancellor (official site of the Order):  the Grand Chancellor
 Permanent Observer Mission of the Sovereign Military Order of Malta to the United Nations (official site of the United Nations):  Visit of H.E. Mr. Jean-Pierre Mazery, the Grand Chancellor and Foreign Minister of the Sovereign Military Order of Malta,  New York, 5 June 2008

External link

Living people
1942 births
People from Paris
Knights of Malta
French Roman Catholics
Officiers of the Légion d'honneur
Knights of the Ordre national du Mérite
Officiers of the Ordre des Arts et des Lettres
Knights Grand Cross of the Order of Merit of the Italian Republic
Knights Grand Cross of the Order of Pope Pius IX
Grand Officers of the Order of Saint-Charles
Recipients of the Order pro Merito Melitensi
Harvard Business School alumni
University of Paris alumni